Events from the year 1948 in Romania. The year saw the formalisation of the Romanian People's Republic.

Incumbents
President of the Provisional Presidium of the Republic: Constantin Ion Parhon.
Prime Minister: Petru Groza.
General Secretary of the Romanian Communist Party: Gheorghe Gheorghiu-Dej.

Events
 28 March – The first elections held in the Romanian People's Republic are held. The People's Democratic Front gain 93.2% of the vote.
 13 April – A new Constitution is adopted, introducing a "people's democracy."
 14 May – The football club FC Dinamo București is founded.
 11 June – The Great National Assembly announces the nationalization of all industry, mines, banking and transportation.
 30 August – The Securitate (Department of State Security) is found.

Births
 17 February – Valentin Ceaușescu, physicist.
 19 July – Argentina Menis, Olympic-medal-winning discus thrower.
 3 August – Ioana Tudoran, Olympic-medal-winning rower.
 13 August – Prince Paul, claimant to the Royal House of Romania.
 28 November – Mariana Nicolesco, operatic soprano (died 2022).

Deaths
 2 February – Smaranda Brăescu, parachuting and aviation pioneer (born 1897).
 27 February – Nicodim, Patriarch of All Romania between 1939 and 1948 (born 1864).
 5 May – Sextil Pușcariu, linguist and philologist (born 1877).
 22 June – Ioan Simu, Greek-Catholic priest and politician (born 1875).
 14 September – Constantin Angelescu, Prime Minister of Romania between 30 December 1933 and 3 January 1934 (born 1869).
 19 December – Ella Negruzzi, lawyer and human rights advocate (born 1876).

References

Years of the 20th century in Romania
1948 in Romania
Romania
Romania